Kannambadi or Kannampadi is a remote tribal settlement located inside the Idukki Wildlife Sanctuary and near the Idukki Hydro Electric Project area in the district of Idukki in Kerala, India.It is noted for its beautiful sceneries and the old government tribal school, started in 1956.

Access 
The nearest town to Kannambady is Upputhara, which is located about 14 km southeast. Privately operated buses provides services to Kannambady from Kattappana and Upputhara.

Distances from nearby places
 Kattappana - 32 km
 Pasuppara - 13 km
 Kottamala - 13 km
 Kozhimala - 21 km

References 

Villages in Idukki district